Mourgana ( or Όρη Τσαμαντά - Ori Tsamanta) is a mountain range in northwestern Greece and southern Albania. Its highest elevation is 1,806 m. It is drained by tributaries of the river Thyamis towards the south by tributaries of the river Drinos towards the north and by the small river Pavllë to the west. There are forests in the lower areas of the mountain and grasslands in the higher elevations. The nearest villages are Tsamantas and Vavouri on the Greek side and Sotirë and Leshnice
on the Albanian side.

See also

 List of mountains in Albania
 List of mountains in Greece

References

Mountain ranges of Albania
Mountain ranges of Greece
Landforms of Ioannina (regional unit)
Landforms of Epirus (region)